William Jones (March 20, 1624 - October 17, 1706) was an English lawyer who emigrated to the United Colonies and became the twenty-fourth Deputy Governor of the Colony of Connecticut.

Biography
Jones was born in London, Middlesex, England. He became a lawyer at Westminster and married Hannah Eaton, daughter of Governor Eaton, on July 4, 1659, in St. Andrew's Church, Holborn, by Reverend Joseph Rowe.
 They arrived in Boston, Massachusetts, on July 27, 1660, in company with the regicides, judges Edward Whalley and William Goffe, both Generals and family members of Oliver Cromwell. They moved to New Haven in August of the same year; took possession of the mansion of Governor Theophilus Eaton, and continued to live there until their deaths. Jones was made a freeman in 1661. One of the most interesting facts in his life was his connection with the two judges, Whalley and Goffe. During their hiding in New Haven in the Judges' Cave, Jones' house was their place of refuge for eleven days. The honors seem to have been shared with Reverend John Davenport during this exciting episode in  New Haven.

Jones and his wife Hannah had thirteen children, four of whom died their first year; Theophilus, Samuel, Rebecca  and  Abigail; one of whom died at three years, Deodat. The eight who reached maturity were William, Nathaniel, Hannah, Elizabeth, Sarah, John, Isaac, and Susanna.

Career
For twenty-eight years, Jones was elected to the office of Assistant, or Magistrate, of the United Colonies. This office combined the duties of a Magistrate with those of a Senator, or member of the Superior House of the Legislature, except during 1685, when Governor Andrews of New York suspended the government of Connecticut.

Jones was elected Deputy-Governor of New Haven in 1664. On the union of this Colony with Connecticut, May 11, 1665, he was chosen one of the magistrates. In July 1691, following the death of James Bishop, Jones was elected Lieutenant Governor by the General Assembly. He was elected to the same office by the freemen in 1692, and was elected each year from 1692 until he retired on May 12, 1698.

Chosen Lieutenant Governor of the Colony of Connecticut in 1689 and reelected each of the next five years, Jones was one of the trustees granted the patent of the city of New Haven by the General Assembly of Connecticut on October 20, 1704.

Death
Jones died on October 17, 1706, in New Haven, Connecticut at the age of 82. Jones and his wife Hannah were buried near her father, Governor Eaton of New Haven, Connecticut.

References

1624 births
1706 deaths
Lawyers from London
Lieutenant Governors of Connecticut
English emigrants
18th-century English lawyers
People of colonial Connecticut